was a Japanese era name (年号, nengō, lit. year name) of the Northern Court during the Era of Northern and Southern Courts after Enbun and before Jōji. This period spanned the years from March 1361 through September  1362. Go-Kōgon's Southern Court rival in Yoshino during this time-frame was

Nanboku-chō overview
  
During the Meiji period, an Imperial decree dated March 3, 1911 established that the legitimate reigning monarchs of this period were the direct descendants of Emperor Go-Daigo through Emperor Go-Murakami, whose  had been established in exile in Yoshino, near Nara.

Until the end of the Edo period, the militarily superior pretender-Emperors supported by the Ashikaga shogunate had been mistakenly incorporated in Imperial chronologies despite the undisputed fact that the Imperial Regalia were not in their possession.

This illegitimate  had been established in Kyoto by Ashikaga Takauji.

Change of era
 1361, also called : The new era name was created to mark an event or series of events. The previous era ended and the new one commenced in Embun 6.

In this time frame, Shōhei (1346–1370) was a Southern Court equivalent nengō,

Events of the Kōan era
 1361 (Kōan 1, 6th month): Snowfall was unusually heavy; and there was also a disastrous fire in Kyoto as well as a violent earthquake.
 1361 (Kōan 1): Eigen-ji, a Zen Buddhist temple located in modern-day Shiga prefecture, was founded Sasaki Ujiyori; and its first Abbot was Jakushitsu Genko.
 1362 (Kōan 2): Hosokawa Kiyouji and Kusunoki Masanori attack Kyoto, Ashikaga Yoshiakira flees, but regains the capital in twenty days.

Notes

References
 Ackroyd, Joyce. (1982) Lessons from History: The Tokushi Yoron. Brisbane: University of Queensland Press. 
 Mehl, Margaret. (1997). History and the State in Nineteenth-Century Japan. New York: St Martin's Press. ; OCLC 419870136
 Nussbaum, Louis Frédéric and Käthe Roth. (2005). Japan Encyclopedia. Cambridge: Harvard University Press. ; OCLC 48943301
 Thomas, Julia Adeney. (2001). Reconfiguring Modernity: Concepts of Nature in Japanese Political Ideology. Berkeley: University of California Press. ; 
 Titsingh, Isaac. (1834). Nihon Odai Ichiran; ou,  Annales des empereurs du Japon.  Paris: Royal Asiatic Society, Oriental Translation Fund of Great Britain and Ireland. OCLC 5850691

External links
 National Diet Library, "The Japanese Calendar" -- historical overview plus illustrative images from library's collection

Japanese eras
1360s in Japan